Woldemichael is a male given name of Ethiopian and Eritrean origin. Examples include:

Woldemichael Abraha, Eritrean politician and Minister of Transport
Woldemichael Ghebremariam, Eritrean politician and Minister of Land, Water, and Environment
Woldemichael Solomon (1820–1906), Ras (Prince) of the Medri Bahri kingdom and Hamasien
Yared Woldemichael (born 1968), Ethiopian boxer

See also
Woldemariam
Wolde (disambiguation)

Ethiopian given names
Amharic-language names